CNKI (China National Knowledge Infrastructure) is a private-owned publishing company in China since 2014. CNKI maintains high annual subscription fees due to its de facto monopoly status on journal search in China. Because its subscription fee raised sharply every year, many elite Chinese universities and research institutions, including the Chinese Academy of Sciences and Peking University, have stopped subscribing to CNKI. 

CNKI owns a system called "China Integrated Knowledge Resources System," including journals, doctoral dissertations, masters' theses, proceedings, newspapers, yearbooks, statistical yearbooks, e-books, patents and standards. In January 2013, CNKI became the second designated DOI agent in mainland China, after the Institute of Scientific and Technical Information of China under the Ministry of Science and Technology.

In May 2022, the State Administration for Market Regulation of China launched an antitrust investigation into CNKI for anti-competitive practices. In June 2022, the Cyberspace Administration of China announced a cybersecurity review on CNKI "to prevent national data security risks, safeguard national security, and protect public interests."

History

In June 1998, the China Academic Journals Electronic Publishing House (CAJEPH) was established, and the standardization system of Chinese academic journals was formally started.

In September 2014, CNKI signed a cooperation contract with the International Journal of Management, Economics and Social Sciences.

In May 2020, access controls to the academic resources database were tightened after a researcher in India drew public attention to a paper on six miners sickened by a possible forerunner of SARS-CoV-2.

The first Forum on Future of World Academic Libraries ( WAL) was held in the same year, with focus on future development of academic libraries and "service innovation". Worldwide experts in the field of knowledge innovation services were invited to explore the knowledge innovation paradigm, as well as service and operation modes.

In 2022, it organized the "WAL Spotlight" Competence Development Program for World Academic Librarians to empower academic libraries. Domestic and overseas knowledge service experts in library research, information intelligence, big data and other fields were invited to give online lectures, sharing practical experiences, case analysis, and research findings in library work.

In May 2022, the State Administration for Market Regulation of China launched an antitrust investigation into CNKI. 

In June 2022, the Cyberspace Administration of China announced a cybersecurity review on CNKI.

References

Academic publishing companies
Chinese digital libraries
Commercial digital libraries
1996 establishments in China
Scholarly search services